Roman Krech (born 14 July 1989) is a Kazakhstani speed skater. He competed at the 2014 Winter Olympics in Sochi, in the 500 meters.

References

External links

1989 births
Living people
Speed skaters at the 2010 Winter Olympics
Speed skaters at the 2014 Winter Olympics
Speed skaters at the 2018 Winter Olympics
Kazakhstani male speed skaters
Olympic speed skaters of Kazakhstan
Speed skaters at the 2017 Asian Winter Games
Asian Games competitors for Kazakhstan
21st-century Kazakhstani people